These are the list of results that England have played from 1970 to 1979.

1970 
Scores and results list England's points tally first.

1971 
Scores and results list England's points tally first.

1972 
Scores and results list England's points tally first.

1973 
Scores and results list England's points tally first.

1974 
Scores and results list England's points tally first.

1975 
Scores and results list England's points tally first.

1976 
Scores and results list England's points tally first.

1977 
Scores and results list England's points tally first.

1978 
Scores and results list England's points tally first.

1979 
Scores and results list England's points tally first.

Year Box 

1970–79
1969–70 in English rugby union
1970–71 in English rugby union
1971–72 in English rugby union
1972–73 in English rugby union
1973–74 in English rugby union
1974–75 in English rugby union
1975–76 in English rugby union
1976–77 in English rugby union
1977–78 in English rugby union
1978–79 in English rugby union